Trichocolea tomentella is a species of liverwort belonging to the family Trichocoleaceae.

It has cosmopolitan distribution.

References

Jungermanniales